Morris station was a Chicago, Rock Island and Pacific Railway station in Morris, Illinois. Unlike many old stations, the depot is still standing on the south side of the track just west of Route 47. The tracks were built by the Rock Island Line in 1853. The single track line is now on the CSX New Rock Subdivision. Across the tracks is the former Illinois Terminal Railway station house, now used as a business. The station is considered for service on Amtrak's proposed Chicago—Moline—Iowa City line. There is speculation that Metra's Rock Island District will be extended to Morris.

References

External links

Other picture

Transportation buildings and structures in Grundy County, Illinois
Former railway stations in Illinois
Historic American Engineering Record in Illinois
Railway stations in the United States opened in 1900
Former Chicago, Rock Island and Pacific Railroad stations